Horace M. Craske was a male athlete who competed for England.

Athletics career
He competed for England in the 1 mile at the 1934 British Empire Games in London.

Craske represented the South London Harriers.

References

English male middle-distance runners
Athletes (track and field) at the 1934 British Empire Games
Commonwealth Games competitors for England